A Intrusa is a 1979 Brazilian drama film directed by Carlos Hugo Christensen, based on the short story "La intrusa" by Jorge Luis Borges. The film is about the parallel lives of two gaucho brothers with Danish ancestry. It was shot in Uruguaiana, Rio Grande do Sul.

Cast
 José de Abreu as Christian
 Arlindo Barreto as Eduardo
 Maria Zilda Bethlem as Juliana
 Palmira Barbosa as Efigênia
 Fernando de Almeida as João Iberra
 Ricardo Marnick 		
 Mauricio Loyola 		
 Heloísa Gadel 	
 Nelson Pinto Bastos 		
 Hermes Lago

Reception
At the 1980 Gramado Film Festival the film won four Golden Kikito awards, including Best Director, Best Actor (José de Abreu), Best Cinematography (Antônio Gonçalves) and Best Music (Astor Piazzolla), and was also nominated for Best Film.

References

External links
 
A Intrusa on "The Garden of Forking Paths" Borges site.

1979 drama films
1979 LGBT-related films
1979 films
Brazilian drama films
Brazilian LGBT-related films
Films based on short fiction
Films directed by Carlos Hugo Christensen
Films shot in Rio Grande do Sul
1970s Portuguese-language films
LGBT-related drama films
Films about gauchos
Films about threesomes